Carson City Raiders is a 1948 American Western film directed by Yakima Canutt and written by Earle Snell. The film stars Allan Lane, Eddy Waller, Frank Reicher, Beverly Jons, Harold Landon and Steve Darrell.

Plot
One of the Allan "Rocky" lane series of B-westerns, this has a cast of characters that go beyond the simple hero-villain plots. Steve Darrell, a busy character actor listed seventh in the cast (even below Rocky's horse), is actually the movie's central character: a man tapped to replace a murdered sheriff. When the bad guys realize he's a reformed outlaw, they think they can blackmail them into helping them. Rocky figures it out first, and they join forces. Harold Goodwin stands in for usual action heavy Roy Barcroft in this one, and has such lines as (when he's supposed to rub out a captured  outlaw who might talk) "Too bad, I was just gettin' to know the guy."

Cast   
Allan Lane as Rocky Lane 
Black Jack as Rocky's Horse
Eddy Waller as Nugget Clark
Frank Reicher as Razor the Barber
Beverly Jons as Mildred Drew
Harold Landon as Jimmy Davis 
Steve Darrell as Tom Drew aka Fargo Jack
Harold Goodwin as Dave Starky
Dale Van Sickel as Henchman Brennan
Tom Chatterton as John Davis
Edmund Cobb as Old Sheriff
Mike Ragan as Joe 
Robert J. Wilke as Ed Noble

References

External links 
 

1948 films
American Western (genre) films
1948 Western (genre) films
Republic Pictures films
American black-and-white films
Films directed by Yakima Canutt
1940s English-language films
1940s American films